Yumemi Kōbō (夢見 工房) is a device sold by the Japanese company Takara Toys that is claimed to be able to induce lucid dreams. 

This assortment of components is claimed to be able to induce a dream about a pre-selected theme while the user sleeps; it periodically activates in concert with the user's rapid eye movement (REM) sleep stages.

A Wired News report from 2004 describes the method of operation :

The manufacturer claims that the recommended fragrance and music selections are based on sleep research—"there is a logic behind the selections". It nevertheless will not guarantee satisfactory outcomes to its customers.

References

External links
Manufacturer's page on Yumemi Kobo (in Japanese) 

Dream
Takara
Japanese inventions